Brevitrygon is a genus of stingrays in the family Dasyatidae from the Indo-Pacific. Its species were formerly contained within the genus Himantura.

Species
Brevitrygon heterura (Bleeker, 1852)
Brevitrygon imbricata (Bloch & Schneider 1801) (Scaly whipray)
Brevitrygon javaensis (Last & White, 2013) (Javan whipray)
Brevitrygon walga (Müller & Henle, 1841) (Dwarf whipray)

References

 
Dasyatidae
Taxa named by Bernadette Mabel Manjaji-Matsumoto